Tim Bendzko (born 9 April 1985) is a German singer-songwriter. He achieved nationwide recognition with his song "Nur noch kurz die Welt retten" and becoming the winner on the Bundesvision Song Contest.

Career

Bendzko grew up in the Köpenick region of Berlin. As a teenager, he attended a sport gymnasium and played with the FC Union Berlin club football up to the "B" age level, around 16. His musical career began with guitar lessons, which he decided to start taking when he was 11 or 12 years old. At age 16, he wrote his first songs. After taking his Abitur, he studied Protestant Theology and non-Christian religions at the Free University of Berlin. He ended his studies after 5 semesters without getting a degree. He then worked temporarily as an auctioneer in the car trade.

In 2009, he registered for the talent competition Söhne puta 
gesucht of Söhne Mannheims. As a winner of the talent competition, he performed in the summer of 2009 before 20,000 spectators at the Berlin Waldbühne, one of Europe's largest concert venues. Then he devoted himself entirely to his music. He received a recording contract with Sony Music and performed as an opening act for Silly on their 2010 tour.

On 17 June 2011, he released his debut album Wenn Worte meine Sprache wären ("If words were my language"), from which the single Nur noch kurz die Welt retten ("Just quickly save the world") was released on 27 May 2011. The album reached number four in the German charts and the single number two. The single, written by Tim Bendzko, Mo Brandis and Simon Triebel, was certified 3× Gold in Germany for sales of more than 450,000 copies. It was also awarded Platinum status in Switzerland and Gold in Austria. The music video was produced by Hagen Decker in Los Angeles. The album, which sold over 500,000 copies in Germany alone, was certified 5× Gold in Germany, Platinum in Switzerland and Gold in Austria.

Bendzko performed as the opening act in Cologne and Leipzig on Elton John's tour of Germany, as well as being the support act for Joe Cocker during his Hard Knocks tour. On 29 September 2011, he came back to his hometown of Berlin for the Bundesvision Song Contest 2011 with the title track of his Album, Wenn Worte meine Sprache wären and won the competition. On 10 November 2011 he won the newcomer Bambi award.

Tim was one of the three coaches in the first season of the German version of The Voice Kids, which aired in 2013.

Discography

Studio albums

Singles

References

External links
 

21st-century German male singers
German male singer-songwriters
1985 births
Singers from Berlin
Living people
Participants in the Bundesvision Song Contest
People from Treptow-Köpenick